The Harry N. Burhans House is a historic Greek Revival house in the Salt Springs area of Syracuse, New York. With a wide lawn, it commands the intersection of old roads Salt Springs Road and East Genesee Street, the latter being one of the main roads of the area. Built in 1837 on a  plot, it was the first house in the area.

In 1916, the house was renovated under supervision of architect Ward Wellington Ward. The renovation added four Mercer fireplaces. The house was listed on the National Register of Historic Places in 2007.

See also
 List of Registered Historic Places in Syracuse, New York

References

Houses on the National Register of Historic Places in New York (state)
Houses completed in 1837
Houses in Syracuse, New York
National Register of Historic Places in Syracuse, New York